Yagha is one of the 45 provinces of Burkina Faso, located in its Sahel Region.

Its capital is Sebba.

In February 2020, 24 civilians were killed and three were kidnapped near a Protestant church in Pansi, Yagha Province.

Departments
Yagha is divided into 6 departments:

References

 
Provinces of Burkina Faso